"Couldn't Have Said It Better" is a song written by James Michael and Nikki Sixx and recorded by Meat Loaf featuring Patti Russo. It was released as a single in 2003.

Background 
James Michael (Sixx:A.M.) wrote the lyrics to this song while Nikki Sixx (Mötley Crüe, Sixx:A.M.) wrote the music. The song is featured on Meat Loaf's 2003 album of the same name.  Meat Loaf and Patti Russo performed this song nightly on the Couldn't Have Said It Better World Tour in 2003 and 2004.

This song is also featured on Meat Loaf's video Bat Out of Hell: Live with the Melbourne Symphony Orchestra.

Charts 
The song debuted at number 1 on the UK Rock Charts and at number 31 on the UK Singles Chart. It also reached the Top 40 on the US AC charts.

References 

2003 singles
Meat Loaf songs
Songs written by James Michael
2003 songs
Songs written by Nikki Sixx
Mercury Records singles
Music videos directed by Nigel Dick